Pseudohongiella acticola is a Gram-negative, aerobic, rod-shaped, non-spore-forming and motile bacterium from the genus of Pseudohongiella which has been isolated from seawater from the Sea of Japan in Korea.

References

Alteromonadales
Bacteria described in 2015